The 2001 election for Mayor of Los Angeles took place on April 10, 2001, with a run-off election on June 5, 2001. Incumbent mayor Richard Riordan was prevented from running for a third term because of term limits. In the election to replace him, then-City Attorney James Hahn defeated Antonio Villaraigosa, the former speaker of the California State Assembly.

Municipal elections in California, including Mayor of Los Angeles, are officially nonpartisan; candidates' party affiliations do not appear on the ballot.

Results

Primary election
The primary election for Mayor was held on April 10, 2001. Villaraigosa finished first, with 30 percent of the vote. Hahn was second with 25 percent of the vote. City elections in Los Angeles are nonpartisan; the top two vote-getters advance to the runoff if no contender reaches 50 percent.

Riordan had endorsed his Senior Advisor and Parks Commissioner, businessman Steve Soboroff, to replace him. Soboroff, the only prominent Republican in the race, finished third with 21 percent of the vote. Also competing in the primary election were longtime Los Angeles City Council member Joel Wachs, United States Representative Xavier Becerra, and then-California State Controller Kathleen Connell. They finished with 11, 6 and 5 percent of the vote, respectively.

The Los Angeles Times made a dual endorsement of Hahn and Villaraigosa in the primary election, while the City's other daily newspapers, The Los Angeles Daily News and The Daily Breeze endorsed Soboroff.

The mayoral campaign of Xavier Becerra ran a tape of someone impersonating Gloria Molina disparaging the voting record of mayoral candidate Antonio Villaraigosa. The tape was run by campaign staffer Lloyd Monserratt, and though no laws had been broken, this action tarnished the reputations of all involved.

General election
Riordan switched his endorsement to Villaraigosa in the general election. Despite the popular Republican Mayor's endorsement, as well as the endorsement of the Los Angeles Times, Villaraigosa was unable to capture a majority. Hahn won the general election on June 5, 2001 with 53.53 percent of the vote, to Villaraigosa's 46.47 percent.

Soboroff and Becerra remained neutral in the general election. Wachs endorsed Villaraigosa.

Further information
Hahn was sworn in as Los Angeles' 40th mayor in the summer of 2001. Hahn faced Villaraigosa in a runoff rematch in the 2005 Los Angeles Mayoral election. In that race, Villaraigosa defeated Hahn to become the 41st mayor of Los Angeles.

Soboroff would go on to become a Senior Fellow at UCLA and to the head of the Playa Vista development on Los Angeles' Westside, while Wachs became president of the Andy Warhol Foundation in New York City and Connell was termed out of her post as State Controller. Becerra remained a member of the United States Congress until his appointment to succeed Senator Kamala Harris as Attorney General of California in 2017.

References and footnotes

External links
 Office of the City Clerk, City of Los Angeles

Mayoral election, 2001
2001 California elections
2001
Los Angeles
April 2001 events in the United States